Leo Alphonso "Red" Miller (February 11, 1897 – October 20, 1973) was a Major League Baseball pitcher. Miller played for the Philadelphia Phillies in the  season. In one career game, he had a 0-0 record with a 32.40 ERA. Miller allowed six runs on six hits, in 1.7 innings pitched. He batted and threw right-handed.

Miller was born in Philadelphia, Pennsylvania and died in Orlando, Florida.

External links

1897 births
1973 deaths
Philadelphia Phillies players
Major League Baseball pitchers
Baseball players from Pennsylvania